Brawny may refer to:
 Brawny, a barony in the southwest of County Westmeath, in the Republic of Ireland. 
 Brawny, a brand of paper towels owned by Georgia-Pacific
 Brawny, NATO reporting name of the Ilyushin Il-40 aircraft
 Brawny, one of the seven giants in the animated film A Snow White Christmas (1980)

See also
Brawn (disambiguation)